The Ahmadiyya Community Bangladesh or Ahmadiyya Jama'at Bangladesh is the branch of the worldwide Ahmadiyya Muslim Community in Bangladesh. There are an estimated 100,000 Ahmadis in the country as of 2004.

History

The Ahmadiyya movement is thought to have reached Bengal in 1905, with Ahmad Kabir Noor Muhammad of Anwara, Chittagong pledging allegiance to Mirza Ghulam Ahmad. He was then followed by Rais Uddin Khan of Kishoreganj. His wife Syeda Azizatunnisa also pledged allegiance and thus became the first Ahmadi woman from Bengal. In 1909, a student named Mubarak Ali from Bogra visited Qadian where he became a member of the movement. The Ahmadiyya movement gained speed in 1912 after the allegiance of Syed Muhammad Abdul Wahid Ahmadi, a Brahmanbarian mawlana. The Ahmadiyya Muslim Community became officially established in Bengal in 1913 with the name of "Anjuman e Ahmadiyya".

Ahmad Taufiq Choudhury, who belonged to the Sunni zamindar family of Selbaras, joined the Ahmadiyya movement where he became the regional leader of Khuddam-ul Ahmadiyya in Sylhet. He later migrated to Mymensingh and became the Ameer (leader) of Ahmadiyya Muslim Jamaat Bangladesh after independence.

Persecution

Since its establishment in Bangladesh, members of the Ahmadiyya Muslim Community have faced persecution from other Muslim groups. In 1963 two Ahmadis were killed in Brahmanbaria. In 1992, the Ahmadiyya headquarters in Dhaka were attacked by a mob and a number of Qurans & other books were burnt. In 1999, a bomb blast at an Ahmadiyya mosque killed seven people. On 29 October 2003, an Ahmadi Imam named Shah Alam in Roghunathpurbak village in Jhikargachha upazila of Jessore was killed. In 2004, the International Khatme Nabuyat Movement (IKNM) besieged several Ahmadiyya mosques countrywide. In 2004, the Government of Bangladesh banned all religious texts of the Ahmadiyya community.

On 17 June 2010 an angry mob vandalised an Ahmadiyya mosque and the house of an Ahmadiyya believer at Ghatail upazila in Tangail Thursday. In February 2013, a mob set fire to Ahmadiyya property at a site which had been prepared to hold the community's centenary celebrations, causing tens of millions worth of damage in local currency.

Countrywide centers

 The Bangali Ahmadiyya Community currently has 120 local chapters across the country, in 425 cities and villages.
 There are 65 missionaries, an MTA (Muslim Television Ahmadiyya) studio in Dhaka and a Jamia Ahmadiyya (Missionary Training College).
 Maharajpur Mosque in the Natore District 
 Ahmadiyya Muslim Mosque in Khulna
 Galim Gazi Mosque in Betal, Kishoregonj

References

External links

 Official website of Ahmadiyya Muslim Community of Bangladesh

Bangladesh
Islam in Bangladesh